Chudaczewo  is a village in the administrative district of Gmina Postomino, within Sławno County, West Pomeranian Voivodeship, in north-western Poland.

The village has a population of 240.

See also
History of Pomerania

References

Chudaczewo